Golden Hits of the Four Seasons is an LP album by the Four Seasons, released by Vee-Jay Records under catalog number LP-1065 as a monophonic recording in 1963, and later in stereo under catalog number SR-1065 the same year.  It reached number 15 on the Billboard 200. The album features seven tracks that charted on the US pop chart, six of which within the top 40 and three number-one singles. In 1964, the album was repackaged as The Beatles vs the Four Seasons in a double-LP set with Vee-Jay's Introducing... the Beatles. This version charted at number 142.

Track listing

Personnel
Nick Massi – vocal arrangements
Charlie Calello, Sid Bass – orchestral arrangements
Charlie Calello – conductor
Gordon Clark – engineer

Charts
Singles - Billboard (United States)

References

1963 greatest hits albums
The Four Seasons (band) albums
Albums arranged by Charles Calello
Albums conducted by Charles Calello
Albums produced by Bob Crewe
Vee-Jay Records compilation albums